The Helms Amendment to the Foreign Assistance Act, sometimes called simply the Helms Amendment, is a 1973 amendment, passed by the U.S. Congress in the wake of the Roe v. Wade  decision by the United States Supreme Court, to limit the use of US foreign assistance for abortion.

Named after North Carolina senator Jesse Helms, the amendment states that "no foreign assistance funds may be used to pay for the performance of abortion as a method of family planning or to motivate or coerce any person to practice abortions."

Background and passage
After the Supreme Court's landmark 1973 decision Roe v. Wade, anti-abortion activists began mobilizing at the federal level. One of the goals of the anti-abortion movement in the wake of Roe was to cut off all federal funding support for abortion care in order to reduce the availability of legal abortions. In the year after the decision, socially conservative, evangelical Protestants who were anti-abortion mobilized to an unprecedented extent, and pro-life lawmakers introduced a number of measures designed to cut off access to abortions in the United States and elsewhere.

Senator Jesse Helms, a prominent opponent of abortion, introduced his amendment to the Foreign Assistance Act during his first term in Congress. It prohibited the use of any U.S. foreign assistance funds for "abortion as a method of family planning". It eventually passed both houses of Congress and was signed into law on December 17, 1973. It has been interpreted by every administration since as an outright ban on funding abortions, including cases of rape, incest, and pregnancies that endanger the life of the mother. It is applied even to countries where abortion is completely legal.

Focus
Despite its focus on "abortion as a method of family planning," American global health funding programs, such as USAID, currently interpret the Helms Amendment language to exclude funding for abortion services in cases not connected to family planning, such as rape, incest, or to save the life of the woman.

The Agency for International Development (AID) halted most abortion related activity due to the passing of the amendment, though they had previously been a very prominent supporter of abortion. This left the World Bank and The United Nations Fund for Population Activities as the only publicly open contributions of support.

Abortion
Several anti-abortion groups support the current interpretation of the Helms Amendment to exclude abortions for rape or incest, considering it an important ban on "taxpayer-funded abortions."

In 1990 Congress provided clarity on the amendment advising USAID programs are in fact allowed to provide counseling and information on all pregnancy options as long as the programs are following each countries' laws.

Opposition
Several abortion-rights and human rights organizations, including  Planned Parenthood, the Global Justice Center, Population Action International, the Center for Health and Gender Equity, Human Rights Watch, and Amnesty International USA pressured United States President Barack Obama to mitigate what they considered the harmful effects of the Helms Amendment. Population Action International, for example, stated that since the Helms Amendment restricts US funds for abortions "as a method of family planning," abortions "conducted as a result of rape, incest, and abortions to save women's lives, are eligible for U.S. support". The Center for Health and Gender Equity worked with other human rights and faith-based organizations in calling on President Obama to take executive action on the Helms Amendment for women raped in conflict. More than 100 Members of Congress also had called on President Obama to take action. One of the ways that President Obama could have taken action would have been through the issuance of a presidential memorandum  but President Obama never issued a presidential memorandum on the Helms Amendment.

During the 2016 Democratic Presidential Primary, candidates (former) Secretary of State Hillary Clinton and U.S. Senator Bernie Sanders (I-VT) each pledged that as president they would take executive action on Helms and work to repeal the Amendment entirely.

Possible repeal
Many women's rights and women's health advocates press for the repeal of the law. Approximately 47,000 women perish annually due to unsafe or illegal abortions, mostly in foreign countries.  Many reported abortions in foreign countries are being performed in unsafe ways by people without proper qualifications and in places that are not fit to medical standards.

The Mexico City Policy is a direct result of the Helms Amendment of 1973. The order bans foreign aid from the United States to be directed to any non-governmental organizations (NGOs) that provide any services relating to abortions. The Mexico City Policy was first initiated in 1984 by President Ronald Reagan and remained active through President George H. W. Bush's administration. In 1993, when President Clinton took office, the order was rescinded until 2001. President George W. Bush placed the order back into effect until his presidency was over in 2009.

When President Obama took office in 2009, the order was once again rescinded, until 2017. On Jan 23, 2017, President Donald Trump signed an executive order implementing the order once again. It was once again rescinded by President Joe Biden in January 2021.

See also 

 Hyde Amendment
 Dobbs v. Jackson Women's Health Organization
 Abortion debate in the United States

References

Jesse Helms
Abortion in the United States
United States foreign relations legislation
United States Agency for International Development
1973 in international relations